1966 and All That may refer to:

1966 and All That (book), a 2005 book by satirist Craig Brown  
1966 and All That (radio), radio adaptation of the above book
1966 and All That, a 1986 art exhibit at the Whitworth Art Gallery
1966 and All That, a 2001 autobiography of soccer player Geoff Hurst
 "1966 and All That", a 1986 song by the band Half Man Half Biscuit on The Trumpton Riots EP

See also
 1066 and All That, a satirical 1930 history book